210 km is a rural locality (a settlement) in Okunevskoye Rural Settlement of Promyshlennovsky District, Russia. The population was 3 as of 2010.

Geography 
210 km is located 17 km west of Promyshlennaya (the district's administrative centre) by road. 209 km is the nearest rural locality. Its Post Code is 652390

Streets 
There are no streets with titles.

References 

Rural localities in Kemerovo Oblast